It's Raining on Santiago is a 1975 French-Bulgarian drama film directed by Helvio Soto, detailing the 1973 Chilean coup d'etat. The title is a code word the Chilean military had broadcast to signal the start of the coup.

Cast 
 Annie Girardot - Maria Olivares
 Jean-Louis Trintignant - Le sénateur
 Bibi Andersson - Monique Calvé
 Naicho Petrov - Salvador Allende
 Henri Poirier - Augusto Pinochet
 Bernard Fresson - Un ministre
 Nicole Calfan - La fille d'Allende
 Laurent Terzieff : Calvé
 André Dussollier - Hugo
 John Abbey - CIA Agent
 Riccardo Cucciolla - Olivares
 Vera Dikova - La femme de Jorge
 Maurice Garrel - Jorge
 Patricia Guzmán - L'étudiante
 Serge Marquand - Général Leigh

References

External links 

1975 drama films
1975 films
Drama films based on actual events
1970s multilingual films
Bulgarian multilingual films
French multilingual films
Films about the Chilean military dictatorship